Ramy Hisham Abdel Aziz Mostafa Rabia (born 20 May 1993) is an Egyptian professional footballer who plays as a centre-back for Egyptian Premier League club Al Ahly and the Egypt national football team.

He began his career with Al Ahly, making his professional debut at the age of seventeen in 2010. Regarded as one of the brightest prospects in Egyptian football, he attracted attention from several clubs before joining Portuguese side Sporting CP in 2014 for a fee of €750,000. However, after one season in which he made only three first team appearances, he rejoined Al Ahly.

Rabia has represented Egypt at under-20 level, captaining the side to victory in the 2013 African U-20 Championship. He made his debut for the senior squad in December 2012 during a friendly match against Qatar.

Early life
Rabia was born in Cairo, Egypt on 20 May 1993.

Club career

Al Ahly
Rabia began his career with Al Ahly, making his debut against Haras El Hodoud under coach Abdul-Aziz Abdul-Shafi at the age of seventeen due to injuries to several first team players. Despite Abduk-Shafi's departure soon after, Rabia continued in the first team under new manager Manuel José de Jesus. After club captain Hossam Ghaly was ruled out with injury, Rabia was chosen as his replacement as a defensive midfielder during the 2013 FIFA Club World Cup in Morocco. He earned praise for his performances during the tournament and the club's subsequent league matches as he helped the club win the Egyptian Premier League title after overcoming a seven point deficit to rivals Zamalek. He attracted attention from several European sides, including Manchester United, Chelsea and Borussia Dortmund. He was offered a trial with French side Lille but was forced to cancel after undergoing surgery for a knee injury suffered during a league match against Smouha.

In December 2013, English Premier League club Hull City submitted an offer for Rabia to join the club on a trial period with the possibility of a loan move for the remainder of the 2013–14 season. The club had previously approached Al Ahly prior to the Club World Cup but negotiations had been delayed to allow Rabia to take part in the competition. However, Al Ahly rejected the offer with club director Sayed Adbel-Hafiz stating "We totally refuse the idea of a player going out on loan from Al Ahly to a club that does not know if they will sign him or not." Despite the move being called off, Hull manager Steve Bruce described Rabia as having "a big future ahead of him."

During his first spell with Al Ahly, Rabia helped the side win two Egyptian Premier League titles, two CAF Champions League titles and two CAF Super Cups.

Sporting CP
In May 2014, Portuguese side Sporting CP submitted several offers for Rabia, starting at €250,000 and rising to €550,000, which were both rejected by Al Ahly who valued the player at €1.5 million. Al Ahly director Wael Gomaa urged Rabia to focus on his commitments to the club and ignore any transfer approaches. However, a transfer was eventually completed in a deal worth around €750,000 with Al Ahly set to earn 15% of any future transfer. Rabia joined the club on a six-year contract with a €45 million release clause. Following his departure, he released a statement to the club's fans, commenting "Al Ahly is the love of my life."

On his arrival at Sporting, Rabia joined the club's reserve side, Sporting CP B. He made his debut for the side in a 3–0 victory over Aves in the Segunda Liga and provided an assist for Lewis Enoh. However, Rabia was forced to undergo surgery on his stomach after his debut to fix a longstanding problem. He had been playing with the injury for a month but stated that he could not "take the pain anymore." After missing five weeks due to the surgery, Rabia returned to the club's reserve side but received criticism from Sporting manager Marco Silva after being deemed at fault for two goals during a 5–0 defeat against Atlético CP. Silva described Rabia as being "in a very delayed stage of his evolution as a player."

In January 2015, Rabia made his debut for Sporting's first team in a 1–0 victory over Boavista in the Taça de Portugal, a knockout cup competition, as a late substitute in place of Ryan Gauld. He made his first start for the club in the first leg of the following round, a 3–2 defeat to Belenenses. In total, he made three first team appearances for Sporting during the season, all in the Taça de Portugal.

Return to Al Ahly
After being sent to train with Sporting's reserve side during preseason prior to the 2015–16 season, Rabia announced his intention to leave Sporting either permanently or on loan. In August 2015, he rejoined his former club Al Ahly on a five-year contract. Al Ahly paid €750,000 to resign Rabia, the same amount he was sold for the previous season, with Sporting also set to receive 15% of any future transfer fee.

During the 2016–17 season, Rabia struggled to maintain his place in the side after suffering several injury setbacks. He was forced to undergo knee surgery in August 2016, initially expected to keep him out for one month, and needed a second operation on the injury the following month. After recovering from surgery, Rabia made two appearances for Al Ahly before experiencing a further setback after colliding with goalkeeper Ahmed Adel Abdel Moneam in training and suffering ankle ligament damage. His injury troubles continued the following season, suffering a groin injury during an international match in November 2017, missing ten matches. In January 2018, he again suffered a groin injury during a league match against rivals Zamalek and was ruled out for two months. After missing the remainder of the season, Rabia was forced to publicly deny reports that he could be forced to retire due to ongoing injury problems, commenting "I can’t say when I will return, it takes time."

International career

Youth teams
Rabia represented Egypt at under-20 level, captaining the side to victory in the 2013 African U-20 Championship. He scored the goal that confirmed the squad's qualification for the 2013 FIFA U-20 World Cup with a header during a 1–0 victory over Algeria and sent the side through to the semi-finals. He led the side to their fourth tournament title and first since 2003 after defeating Ghana in the final. Rabia later represented Egypt at under-23 level, playing in the side's unsuccessful qualifying campaign for the 2016 Summer Olympics.

Despite still being in recovery after undergoing knee surgery, Rabia was named in manager Rabie Yassin's preliminary squad for the Under-20 World Cup. The injury forced Rabia to miss the side's warm up matches prior to the tournament but he returned prior to Egypt's first group match and was appointed captain of the squad, commenting "I only came back a few days before our first game, so I didn’t expect this honor and I know I owe the coach a lot." He featured in all three of Egypt's group matches as they were eliminated after finishing third.

Senior team
Rabia made his debut for the Egypt senior team under coach Bob Bradley on 28 December 2012 during a 2–0 victory over Qatar. On 7 March 2013, Rabia scored his first senior international goal in a friendly match against Qatar, scoring his side's only goal in a 3–1 defeat. He scored another goal in his following appearance, a 2–0 victory over Zambia before scoring his first competitive goal in 2015 during a 3–0 victory over Tanzania during the qualifying rounds of the 2017 Africa Cup of Nations.

In October 2017, Rabia was part of the Egyptian side that qualified for the 2018 FIFA World Cup, the first time the nation had reached a tournament since 1990, after defeating Congo 2–1. However, his injury problems during the 2017–18 led to him being omitted from Egypt's squad for the tournament.

Career statistics

Scores and results list Egypt's goal tally first, score column indicates score after each Rabia goal.

Honours
Al Ahly
 Egyptian Premier League: 2010–11, 2013–14, 2015–16, 2016–17, 2017–18, 2018–19, 2019–20
 Egypt Cup: 2016–17, 2019–20
 Egyptian Super Cup: 2012, 2015, 2018
 CAF Champions League: 2012, 2013, 2019–20, 2020-21
 CAF Confederation Cup: 2014
 CAF Super Cup: 2013, 2014, 2021 (May), 2021 (December)
 FIFA Club World Cup:Third-Place 2021 FIFA Club World Cup
Egypt U20
 African U-20 Championship: 2013

References

External links
 

1993 births
Living people
Footballers from Cairo
Egyptian footballers
Egypt international footballers
Association football defenders
Egyptian Premier League players
Al Ahly SC players
Sporting CP footballers
2013 African U-20 Championship players
2015 Africa U-23 Cup of Nations players
Egypt youth international footballers
Egyptian expatriates in Portugal
Expatriate footballers in Portugal